Faramarzan may refer to:
 Faramarzan Rural District
 Faramarzan, alternate name of Jenah